Andrija Hebrang (born 27 January 1946) is a Croatian physician and politician. A member of the Croatian Democratic Union (HDZ), he is a former member of the Croatian Parliament. A physician by vocation, Hebrang had served three terms as Croatia's Minister of Health (1990–1992, 1993–1998, and 2003–2005) and spent three months as Minister of Defence (May–October 1998) under six different Prime Ministers. In addition, he was his party's candidate in the 2009–10 Croatian presidential election, eventually finishing third behind Ivo Josipović, and Milan Bandić, winning 12 percent of the vote in the first round.

Early life
Andrija Hebrang was born in Belgrade, Yugoslavia (now Serbia), to Andrija Hebrang, a prominent Croatian-Yugoslav politician and Olga Strauss, who came from a well-to-do Pakrac Jewish family. Her parents saw to her education, and she learned to play piano, and to speak French and German. Hebrang father joined the Communist Party and fought for the Partisans in World War II, becoming a close friend and adviser to Marshal Josip Broz Tito, eventually becoming a high ranking government member. However, in the late 1940s he fell out of favor with senior Party members, was arrested for treason by the Yugoslav government, and subsequently disappeared. The date of his death and the circumstances are unknown, though it is presumed he died ca. 1949 in a Belgrade prison; the circumstances remain unclear and his body was never recovered. Ustashas killed 16 members of the Hebrang family during the Holocaust and another ten members of his family have been killed by the communist regime of newly founded FPR Yugoslavia.

Young Andrija, along with his mother and siblings were put under house arrest in 1948. His mother Olga was imprisoned for twelve years and the children were sent to live with their aunt Ilona in Zagreb. They lived very poorly, as Ilona's husband was sent to the prison camp at Goli Otok for several years and she was made to raise the three young children alone. Andrija saw his mother again when he was eleven and she was released from prison in 1960. The family was forced to change their surname to "Markovac" in order for Olga to find employment.

After finishing gymnasium, Hebrang enrolled at the School of Medicine, University of Zagreb where he received his doctorate specializing in radiology and oncology, and began teaching at the university as a professor in 1985. He is married to Danijela Vrhovski-Hebrang, a doctor of medical biochemistry at the University of Zagreb, and they have three children.

Political career
In 1990, he became a member of the newly formed Croatian Democratic Union. He became the Minister of Health from 1990 to 1992 and again from 1993 to 1998. During the Croatian War of Independence he served as a coordinator of the armed forces from 1993 to 1994. He was first elected to the Croatian parliament in 1993 and again in 1995.

After the death of the Minister of Defense Gojko Šušak in 1998, he temporarily took over the position for four months. Afterwards, he pulled himself out of political life. He returned in 2001 as a member of the Croatian True Revival party led by Miroslav Tuđman, but after talks with the new head of the HDZ Ivo Sanader, he returned to the Croatian Democratic Union. After the HDZ's victory in the Croatian parliamentary elections of 2003, he joined Sanader's government as one of the two vice-presidents and the Minister of Health and Social Welfare from 2003 to 2005. Due to health reasons, he gave up his positions in government and returned to being a member of the parliament.

Presidential run
In July 2009, he was chosen by the HDZ to be their candidate for the 2009–2010 presidential election. He competed in the first round with eleven other candidates and won the third place with 12.04% of the vote.

Personal life 
Hebrang is Jewish. He is married to Danijela Vrhovski and they have three children together.

Awards
 Grand Order of King Dmitar Zvonimir (1995)

References

External links
 Croatian Parliament's profile of Hebrang 
 Profile at HDZ page 
 Profile at the Ruđer Bošković Institute 

1946 births
Living people
Physicians from Belgrade
Croatian people of Jewish descent
Croatian radiologists
Representatives in the modern Croatian Parliament
Croatian Democratic Union politicians
School of Medicine, University of Zagreb alumni
Croatian True Revival politicians
Health ministers of Croatia
Defence ministers of Croatia
Candidates for President of Croatia
Politicians from Zagreb
Croats of Serbia